Nathan Staios (born May 16, 2001) is a Canadian-American professional ice hockey defenseman currently playing with the Florida Everblades in the ECHL as a prospect under contract with the Florida Panthers of the National Hockey League (NHL).

Playing career
Staios was selected 17th overall in the first round of the 2017 OHL Entry Draft by the Windsor Spitfires.  He was traded to the Hamilton Bulldogs in exchange for future OHL draft picks prior to the 2019–20 season.

When the OHL shut down during the 2020–21 season due to COVID-19, Staios played 6 games for the Utica Comets of the American Hockey League.

For the 2021–22 season playing for Hamilton, Staios led all OHL defencemen in scoring, with 66 points in 50 games.  He was named a First Team All-Star and won the Max Kaminsky Trophy as the OHL's best defenceman.  He was also named the CHL Defenceman of the Year.

As a sought after undrafted free agent, Staios was signed to a three-year, entry-level contract with the Florida Panthers on July 13, 2022.

Personal
Staios is the son of former Hamilton Bulldogs President and General Manager and former NHL defenceman Steve Staios. Staios was born in Atlanta, when his father was a member of the Atlanta Thrashers.

Career statistics

Regular season and playoffs

International

Awards and honors

References

External links

2001 births
Living people
Florida Everblades players
Hamilton Bulldogs (OHL) players
Huddinge IK players
Sportspeople from Oakville, Ontario
Ice hockey people from Georgia (U.S. state)
Ice hockey people from Ontario
People from Atlanta
Utica Comets players
Windsor Spitfires players